The Oslo Center was founded by former Norwegian prime minister Kjell Magne Bondevik in January 2006. The purpose of the center is to work for world peace, human rights and inter-religious tolerance worldwide. The center cooperates closely with the Carter Center in Atlanta, the Kim Dae Jung Library in Seoul and the Crisis Management Initiative in Helsinki.

Shortly after the announced opening of The Oslo Center, Bondevik told Norwegian newspaper Aftenposten, that the center would focus primarily on negotiations between governments and take on the role as a peace mediator in conflict areas around the world. He also said that the center would work closely with western governments and international human rights organizations and take advantage of the vast political networks that its members, all former politicians and bureaucrats, had built up over the years.

The center has eight full time staff members, all of whom are former Norwegian politicians and bureaucrats, and three part time staff members. The Oslo Center is a non-profit organization and as a consequence relies solely upon donations from the general public. According to the official webpage, the center had enough funds from various Norwegian businesses and corporations in 2007 to keep it up and running for the following five years. The budget for 2007 was 10.5 million Norwegian krones.

Projects

 Burma: 
Bondevik co-authored the book prisoners in our own country about human rights abuse in Burma
 North Korea, failure to protect: 
Commissioning a study of the present humanitarian situation in North Korea
 Club de Madrid: 
An organization dedicated to democracy around the world
 Inter-culture and inter-religious dialogue: 
working for inter-religious dialogue
 New born’s right to life: 
organization working for the rights of children*
 The right to life and the present situation in the Horn of Africa: 
organization working in the Horn of Africa
 Health and human rights: 
Mapping out religious health assets that can be mobilized in the battle against AIDS/HIV in sub-Saharan Africa

Criticism of funding sources 
In 2021, the Norwegian newspaper Dagbladet reported that Bondevik personally received 5 million NOK (around 560,000 USD) from Muslim World League, an NGO with close connections to the Saudi Arabian government, between the years 2019-2021. 

The following year, the Norwegian newspaper Vårt Land disclosed that Bondevik had received an undisclosed amount to write a favorable op-ed piece in their pages earlier in 2022, praising the government of Kazakhstan. This drew ire due to the increasingly authoritarian handling of  protests in Kazakhstan that same year.

Criticism of nepotism
Kjell Magne Bondevik received criticism from both political commentators and newspapers when he informed the media about the new center. The recurring theme in this criticism was that Bondevik was using his political status to gain an unfair advantage for himself and his new center. Some commentators also felt that it was inappropriate for a recently retired prime minister to accept large sums of money from both the Government and the Norwegian business community, which up until that moment had benefitted from his politics. This was viewed by some as nepotism.

Bondevik was also criticized for selecting President of the Norwegian Parliament, Thorbjørn Jagland, as chairman of the board for the new center. Jagland, also received massive criticism for allowing Bondevik, a retired politician, to announce the opening of the centre in Jagland's Parliament office. Some felt that this raised serious doubts as to whether this was a private peace center, or whether it was under the auspices of the Norwegian Government.

Bondevik's reaction to the criticism
In an interview given to Norwegian newspaper Stavanger Aftenblad, on the 30th of January 2006, Bondevik responded to some of the recent criticism that had been directed against him. In this interview he defended his actions and assured his critics that he had done nothing wrong. He also made it clear that the funds given to the center came without any strings attached. He also went on record to say that securing donations from private companies and businesses was in his opinion a positive thing, and he encouraged other humanitarian organizations to do the same.

References

External links
The Oslo Center webpage

Human rights organisations based in Norway
Peace organisations based in Norway
Organisations based in Oslo
Organizations established in 2006